Berala is a conjunctional western suburb of Sydney, which connects the inner west, south west and west parts of Sydney in the state of New South Wales, Australia, located 16 kilometres west of the central business district, in the local government area of Cumberland Council.

History
Berala is derived from Bareela, an Aboriginal word for a musk duck. The area was originally swampy and attracted wild birds. When the railway line was being extended from Lidcombe to Regents Park, the names Torrington, Sidmouth and Bareela were considered. The station opened in 1912, the public school in 1924 and the post office in 1927.

Transport
Berala railway station is on the Bankstown Line of the Sydney Trains network. Bus services run between Auburn and Bankstown.

Commercial area
A small group of shops is located beside the railway station, including a Charcoal Chicken, a newsagent and the EVT bakery. A Woolworths is located next to the train station.

Demographics
According to the 2016 census, there were 9,049 residents in Berala. 36.5% of people were born in Australia. The next most common countries of birth were China 15.5%, Vietnam 8.2%, Afghanistan 3.2%, South Korea 2.8% and Philippines 2.6%. The most common reported ancestries were Chinese 30.0%, Australian 7.3%, English 6.8%, Vietnamese 4.9% and Lebanese 4.5%. 20.8% of people only spoke English at home. Other languages spoken at home included Mandarin 15.5%, Cantonese 15.2%, Arabic 7.2%, Vietnamese 4.3% and Korean 3.6%. The most common responses for religious affiliation were No Religion 23.1%, Catholic 18.2%, Islam 17.0% and Buddhism 13.4%.

Schools
Berala Public School is the local public primary school. St Peter Chanel Catholic Primary School caters for primary aged children mainly of Roman Catholic denomination. There is also Trinity Junior Catholic College (formerly known as St Peter Chanel Girls High School).

Sport and recreation

The Berala Community Centre is currently of use for recreation activities.

Coleman Park comprises two full-size soccer fields, two mini soccer fields, a baseball field, a children's recreation area and basketball facilities. The Lidcombe Waratahs soccer club is based there.

The Berala Bears is a junior rugby league team that plays in the Canterbury-Bankstown District Junior Rugby League competition. Their colours are gold and black, and their home ground is at Guilfoyle Park in the neighbouring suburb of Regents Park. Former Berala Bears players include Brisbane Broncos forward Terry Matterson, Sydney Roosters winger Daniel Tupou, former Canterbury-Bankstown Bulldogs and Wests Tigers winger Matt Utai, South Sydney Rabbitohs half Jeremy Smith, Manly-Warringah Sea Eagles forward Anthony Watmough, South Sydney Rabbitohs hooker Apisai Koroisau and Sydney Roosters utility player Samisoni Langi, Melbourne Storm winger Isaac Lumelume.

References

External links
  [CC-By-SA]

Suburbs of Sydney
Cumberland Council, New South Wales